The Calgary Metropolitan Region (CMR), also commonly referred to as the Calgary Region, is a conglomeration of municipalities centred on Calgary, the largest city in Alberta.

With the Government of Alberta's establishment of the Calgary Metropolitan Region Board (CMRB) in 2017, the CMR's boundaries were legislated to include the City of Calgary, Foothills County to the south, Rocky View County to the west, north, and east, and a western portion of Wheatland County further to the east. Also within these boundaries are the cities of Airdrie and Chestermere, seven towns: Cochrane, Crossfield, Diamond Valley, High River, Irricana, Okotoks, and Strathmore, two villages: Beiseker and Longview, and two First Nations communities: Tsuu T'ina 145 and Eden Valley 216. Not all of these, however, are administrative members of the CMRB.

The Calgary census metropolitan area (CMA) as delineated by Statistics Canada is smaller than the CMR. The Calgary CMA includes Calgary, Rocky View County, Airdrie, Beiseker, Chestermere, Cochrane, Crossfield, Irricana, and Tsuu T'ina 145.

The Calgary Metropolitan Region is a major transportation hub for southern Alberta, Saskatchewan, eastern British Columbia, and parts of the northern United States. It is home to the Calgary International Airport, the fourth busiest airport in Canada in terms of total aircraft movements.

Calgary CMA 

The Calgary CMA, as defined by Statistics Canada, includes the following nine municipalities:
three cities (Airdrie, Calgary and Chestermere);
one municipal district (Rocky View County, which includes Langdon – the CMA's largest hamlet);
three towns (Cochrane, Crossfield, and Irricana);
one village (Beiseker); and
one First Nations reserve (Tsuu T'ina Nation, which includes the Townsite of Redwood Meadows).

In the 2011 Census, the Calgary CMA had a population of 1,214,839 living in 464,001 of its 488,451 total dwellings, a 12.6% change from its 2006 population of 1,079,310, making it the largest CMA in Alberta and the fourth largest in Canada.

Also in terms of area, the Calgary CMA makes up approximately 40% of Statistics Canada's Division No. 6 in Alberta. The balance of Division No. 6 includes the census consolidated subdivisions of the MD of Foothills No. 31 to the south and Mountain View County to the north.

Foothills County and the municipalities within are often considered as part of Calgary's metropolitan area due to, among other things, the MDs shared boundary with the City of Calgary and the bedroom community nature of towns like Okotoks, High River, and Diamond Valley

Demographics

Ethnicity

Note: Totals greater than 100% due to multiple origin responses.

Language 
The question on knowledge of languages allows for multiple responses. The following figures are from the 2021 Canadian Census, and lists languages that were selected by at least 1,000 respondents.

Calgary Metropolitan Region Board 

The Calgary Metropolitan Region Board (CMRB) was legislated through the enactment of the CMRB Regulation in 2017, and will be officially established on its effective date of January 1, 2018. Municipalities that will be participating as members of the CMRB include the cities of Airdrie, Calgary, and Chestermere, the towns of Cochrane, Okotoks, High River and Strathmore, the MD of Foothills No. 31, Rocky View County, and Wheatland County.

Calgary Regional Partnership 

Founded in 1999, the Calgary Regional Partnership (CRP) is a cooperative between 15 urban municipalities in the greater Calgary area that deals with regional growth and planning issues. The CRP's motto is Thinking regionally... acting locally...

Membership 
The CRP's current membership includes three cities (Airdrie, Calgary, and Chestermere), eight towns (Banff, Canmore, Cochrane, Diamond Valley, Irricana, Nanton, Okotoks, and Strathmore, and one townsite (Redwood Meadows). Of these thirteen municipalities, four of the ten towns (Banff, Canmore, Nanton, and Strathmore) are outside, but in proximity to, the Calgary Region's boundaries as defined in this article. Of the remaining six towns, two of them (Diamond Valley, and Okotoks) are outside the Calgary CMA boundaries as defined by Statistics Canada.

Past members 
Membership in the CRP once consisted of the four municipal districts and two additional towns. These included the MD of Bighorn No. 8, the MD of Foothills No. 31, Rocky View County, Wheatland County and the towns of Crossfield and High River. The MD of Bighorn No. 8 pulled out of the CRP in March 2009 due to the lack of opportunity for infrastructure connectivity to the balance of the Calgary Region. In June 2009, the latter three opposed the Calgary Metropolitan Plan that was being considered for approval by the CRP's member municipalities. All three subsequently withdrew from the CRP in September 2009. Crossfield and High River withdrew from the CRP in December 2011 and April 2013 respectively citing concerns that the CRP was becoming another layer of government.

In an attempt to bring the MD of Foothills No. 31 and Rocky View County back to the CRP, Alberta's Minister of Municipal Affairs, Doug Griffiths, requested that the two municipal districts and the CRP engage in mediation. All parties agreed to participate and the mediation process has since concluded with a report delivered to Minister Griffiths for review and decision.

List of municipalities 

thumb|200px|right|Okotoks 

The following is a list of municipalities that are included as part of the Calgary CMA, or they are recognized administrative members of the CMR or they are enveloped within the established boundaries of the Calgary Metropolitan Region Board as defined in provincial statute.

See also 
 Calgary
 Calgary-Edmonton Corridor
 Edmonton metropolitan region
 Census Metropolitan Area
 https://www.calgarymetroregion.ca/

References

External links 
 

 
Metropolitan areas of Alberta